"Sexy Girl" is a song by Italian pop singer Sabrina. It was released in August 1986 by Baby Records as the first single from her debut album Sabrina. Produced by Claudio Cecchetto, the song became a top 20 hit in her native Italy and was also successful two years later as a remixed version in Finland.

Formats and track listings
 7" single
 "Sexy Girl" – 3:20
 "Sexy Girl" (instrumental) – 5:00
 12" maxi
 "Sexy Girl" (long version) – 7:03
 "Sexy Girl" (instrumental dance) – 6:00

 12" maxi – Remixes
 "Sexy Girl" (remix) – 5:30
 "Sexy Girl" (club mix) – 4:00
 "Sexy Girl" (USA radio version) – 3:40

 CD maxi
 "Sexy Girl" (long version) – 7:03
 "Sexy Girl" (instrumental dance) – 6:00
 "Sexy Girl" (remix) – 5:30

Credits
 Written by Matteo Bonsanto, N. Hackett and Roberto Rossi
 Photography by Fabio Nosotti
 Artwork by and "Sexy Girl" logo designed by Massimo Capozzi
 Remixes by Ma-Ma, Walter Biondi and Jay Burnett
 Executive produced by Matteo Bonsanto and Roberto Rossi
 Produced by Claudio Cecchetto

Charts

1 Remixed version

References

1986 debut singles
1988 singles
Sabrina Salerno songs
1986 songs